Leonia, New Jersey is a borough in Bergen County, New Jersey, United States.

Leonia may also refer to:
 Leonia (gastropod), a genus of gastropods in the family Pomatiidae
 Leonia (plant), a genus of plants in the family Violaceae
 Leonia, Greater Poland Voivodeship, a village in Poland
 Leonia, Idaho, a community in Idaho, United States
 Leonia Janecka otherwise Leonia Nadelman (1909–2003), Polish painter
 Leonia Touroff, birth name of Eleanor Glueck (1898–1972), American social worker and criminologist